"Shaken, not stirred" is a catchphrase associated with the fictional character James Bond. 

Shaken, not stirred also may refer to:

 Shaken but Not Stirred, a 1982 video game based on James Bond

Music:
 Shaken Not Stirred (David Benoit album), 1994 
 Shaken Not Stirred (Phil Vassar album), 2004 
 Shaken Not Stirred (Michael Daugherty), a 1994 composition and James Bond tribute by Michael Daugherty

See also 
 STIR/SHAKEN, a telephone security protocol
 Shaken and Stirred: The David Arnold James Bond Project, a compilation of James Bond movie themes